Homosexual Desire (French: Le désir homosexuel) is a 1972 book by French intellectual Guy Hocquenghem. The book is polemical and focuses on the desire of homosexual men, the power of the phallus as a cultural symbol, and sexual liberation. It was the first book in the queer theoretic movement of asociality.

Background 
He was active in the New Left and its internal disagreements over the nature of homosexuality, as well as the psychoanalytic theoretical scene in France. He was a close friend of René Schérer, a French theorist who sought to eliminate negative cultural attitudes toward pedophilia and child sexuality.

Publication and contents 
Homosexual Desire, originally Le désir homosexuel, was written by Guy Hocquenghem and published in the French language by Editions Universitaires in 1972. The book was translated into English in 1978 by Daniella Dangoor; this translation was reprinted in the United States in 1993.

The book is polemical and sought the liberation of homosexual men over their assimilation. The primary aim of the book is to reduce the symbolic value of the phallus over society; for Hocquenghem, the dominance of the phallus leads to the subordination of women and homosexual men, and many social problems can be traced to the phallus. He argues that homosexual desire – inward feelings of same-sex attraction that are at once produced and repressed by heterosexist society – can be political, and that like the civil unrest in the May 68 movement, it can lead to the liberation of homosexual men. In his argument, homosexual desire is focused on the anus (a valueless organ), so it cannot be concerned with futurity. He argues that the repression of homosexual desire – not the death drive of Freud's psychoanalysis – leads to men lashing out in masochist fits of rage in attempts to liberate themselves (in modern parlance, internalised homophobia). Hocquenghem's notion of sexual liberation also included children; he argued that children are oppressed by society for their sexuality, and that adult–child sex is not an inherently abusive practice.

Reception and legacy 
The publication of Homosexual Desire preceded Michel Foucault's The History of Sexuality by four years, another influential book in the study of desire and homosexual identity. It was the first queer theoretic work about queer antisociality, a theory – advanced by writers like Lee Edelman – declaring homosexuality incompatible with many of society's values.

Notes and references

Notes

Citations

Bibliography

 
 
 
 
 
 
 

1972 non-fiction books
Books about psychoanalysis
Books about the philosophy of sexuality
French non-fiction books
Gay non-fiction books
Queer theory